The Bebo Norman discography is about the works of contemporary Christian musician Bebo Norman.

Discography

Independent albums
 The Fabric of Verse (1996) - Independent

Studio albums

Compilation albums

Holiday albums

Singles

Other album appearances
This is the list of his other album appearances.
Seasons of Reflection, 2012.... "One Bright Hour" [Starsong] 
Awaken My Soul: Songs of Redemption, 2012 .... "Sing Over Me" [StarSong] 
BEC Recordings Summer Sampler 2011, 2011 .... "Everything I Hoped You'd Be" (from Ocean) [BEC] 
Christmas Is All Around Us, 2010 .... "What Child Is This" [StarSong] 
Open the Eyes of My Heart: Platinum Edition, 2010 .... "Great Light Of The World" [INO] 
O Come All Ye Faithful: A Christmas Album, 2010 .... "Joy to the World," "Have Yourself A Merry Little Christmas" (from Christmas...) [BEC] 
WOW Best Of 2004, 2010 .... "Great Light of the World" (from Myself When I Am Real) [EMI CMG] 
Workout & Worship, 2009 .... "Pull Me Out" [Starsong] 
Christian Music's Most Requested, 2007 .... "Great Light of the World" (from Myself When I Am Real) [Brentwood] 
The Way We Love EP, 2007 .... "Sunday" (from Between the Dreaming and the Coming True) [Provident] 
The Ultimate Collection: Love Songs, 2006 .... "A Page Is Turned" [EMI CMG] 
WOW Worship: Aqua, 2006 .... "Sometimes By Step" (w/ Rich Mullins) [Provident] 
WOW Hits 2006, 2005 .... "Nothing Without You" [Sparrow] 
Come Let Us Adore Him, 2005 .... "Mary's Prayer" (New Version w/ Christine Byrd), "Holy, Holy, Holy Lord" (w/ Danielle Young and Friends) [Essential] 
The Christ: His Passion, 2004 .... "Beautiful Scandalous Night" (w/ Sixpence); "Lamb Of God (Agnus Dei)" (w/ Casting Crowns); "Yes I Will" (w/ Joy Williams) [Essential] 
WOW Hits 2005, 2004 .... "Disappear" [EMI CMG] 
WOW Worship: Red, 2004 .... "Amazing Love" [Word] 
WOW Hits 2004, 2003 .... "Great Light of the World" (From Myself When I Am Real) [Sparrow] 
City on a Hill: The Gathering, 2003 .... "The Gathering" [Essential] 
It Takes Two: 15 Collaborations & Duets, 2003 .... "Mercies New" (w/ Nichole Nordeman) [Sparrow] 
Dove Hits 2003, 2003 .... "Great Light Of The World" (From Myself When I Am Real) [Reunion] 
Essential Hits Ten, 2002 .... "The Hammer Holds" (From The Fabric of Verse) [Essential] 
WOW Hits 2003, 2002 .... "Holy Is Your Name" (from City On A Hill: Sing Alleluia) [Sparrow] 
City on a Hill: Sing Alleluia, 2002 .... "Holy Is Your Name" [Essential] 
WOW Hits 2002, 2001 .... "Cover Me" (From BigBlueSky) [Sparrow] 
Above the Groove: 17 Songs From Today's Top Christian Artists, 2002 .... "Everything Under The Sun" [Provident] 
Essential Energy Christmas, 2000 .... "Mary's Prayer" [Essential] 
Celebrate Freedom Live, 1998 .... "Stand" (From Ten Thousand Days) [Benson] 
The Awakening Volume 1, 1996 .... "The Hammer Holds" (From The Fabric of Verse) [Awakening]

References

Bebo Norman
Norman, Bebo
Norman, Bebo